Lahille Island is an island  long, lying  west of Nunez Point off the west coast of Graham Land, Antarctica. It was discovered by the French Antarctic Expedition, 1903–05, and charted as a point on the coast which Jean-Baptiste Charcot named after Argentine naturalist Fernando Lahille (1861–1940). Charcot's later expedition, 1908–10, determined the feature to be an island.

See also 
 List of Antarctic and sub-Antarctic islands

References

Islands of Graham Land
Graham Coast